Banana Boat is a Polish a cappella sextet, authoring and performing original songs representing the genre of neo-shanties. Being one of the pioneers of the new genre, the group retains its simultaneous focus on contemporary interpretations of traditional sea shanties and maritime music. Owing to its characteristic six-part, jazzy harmony, departing from the traditional sound of the music of the sea, the group has become one of the emblems of what the international artists of the maritime stage have informally come to dub as the Polish style maritime song. With maritime music constantly in the focus of its activity, since 2004, Banana Boat has also been experimenting with other musical genres, including popular and jazz compositions, inviting other artists to participate in individual projects. The group is a Member of International Seasong and Shanty Association (ISSA).

History
Banana Boat evolved from a multi-member formation Jack Steward, founded by Maciej Jędrzejko and functioning in the years 1993–1994. The line-up of the formation was composed of maritime culture aficionados - high-school students from the city of Sosnowiec, mainly representing the Stanisław Staszic Grammar School in Sosnowiec, the Emilia Plater Grammar School in Sosnowiec, and the Technical High School of Mechanical and Steel Industry in Sosnowiec. The central idea behind the singing youth's efforts was to organize a sailing expedition, whose objective was to circumnavigate Iceland. The musical project itself was intended to encourage teachers to take interest in the richness of maritime culture as a vast educational resource and - with their help - to gain the support of the municipal and (then still budding) corporate sponsorship for the idea of the expedition. Even though the Iceland project never came to pass, and Jack Steward eventually ceased to exist in 1994, Maciej Jędrzejko invited Paweł Konieczny, Aleksander Kleszcz and Karol Wierzbicki of the ex-Jack Steward's line-up to help form a new group, which, since 1994, already as an a cappella quartet, adopted the name of Banana Boat. Thus formed, Banana Boat made its debut on the stage of the 1994 Tratwa Festival in Katowice and, subsequently, it gained its early recognition by winning (among others) the Commander Zbyszek Sowiński Award (Tratwa'94), the Main Prize of the 1994 edition of the Prosiak Festival and, importantly, an honorary mention of the jury of the 1996 edition of the prestigious Shanties Festival in Cracow, Poland.

In the years 1996–1998, the group - whose members, by then, had commenced their university education - suspended its activity, only to return to the maritime stages of Poland by the end of 1998. At this stage, Banana Boat made its name as an a cappella quintet, which - reinforced by the former bass singer of the famous Polish group North Cape, Piotr "Qdyś" Wiśniewski - transformed into the present-day sextet at the turn of 2008 and 2009. Since 1998, the group has been awarded the most important prizes of the Polish festivals of maritime music, recorded three albums and a toplist single, and participated in numerous collective projects. Currently, Banana Boat gives concerts and recitals in Europe and outside of it, performing both for the audiences of small-audience clubs and those of large international festivals.

Banana Boat Members
Today, Banana Boat consists of the following musicians:

 Maciej Jędrzejko|Maciej "YenJCo." Jędrzejko, the group's founder, frontman and leader;
 Paweł "Konik" Konieczny, the formation's co-founder, composer and high tenor;
 Paweł Jędrzejko ("Synchro"), the author of the majority of the band's original lyrics and performer of bari-tenor parts;
 Tomasz "Mundry" Czarny, the Banana Boat's arranger, composer and bari-tenor;
 Michał "Ociec" Maniara, the manager of the Art Agency BananaArt.Pl Art and performer of baritone parts;
 Piotr "Qdyś" Wiśniewski, the group's bass singer.

The present-day Banana Boat members are active yachtsmen: Paweł Jędrzejko (formerly a professional navigator), holds an ocean-going yachtmaster's licence; his younger brother Maciej, the group's founder, is an ocean skipper, while other Banana Boat members all hold offshore licenses, which largely contributes to the positive reception of the Banana Boat songs. Professionally, the Banana Boat musicians represent such disciplines as medicine and dentistry, banking and law, trade and academic literary and culture studies.

Organizational, propagatory and charitable activity
In the years 2002-2007 Banana Boat, working in collaboration with the Municipal Cultural Center in Łaziska Górne (Poland), acted as the organizer of the International Festival of Seasong and Shanty "Zęza";
In 2006, the groups participated in an all-Polish charity project To See the Sea, the proceeds from which supported the medical treatment of Polish shantymen in need;
In 2008, Maciej Jędrzejko, the group's leader, was appointed as the artistic director of the International Festival World Music Fusion - Euroszanty & Folk in Sosnowiec (Poland);
Every year, Banana Boat participates in the charity events of the Great Orchestra of Christmas Charity;
Maciej Jędrzejko is the founder and Editor-in-Chief of the "Free Sea-Shanty Portal Szantymaniak.Pl" and Editor-in-Chief of the "Szantymaniak Magazine" (in Polish);
Each year, individual members of the group are appointed as jurors of sea-song festivals; they regularly offer workshops to other musicians of the Polish maritime stage and sea-song fans.
Banana Boat participates in the charity educational program "Tunes to Teens," sponsored by Contemporary A Cappella Society of America.

Concerts and international cooperation
Apart from numerous concerts in Poland,  Banana Boat has performed in the Czech Republic (Fulnek), in Italy (Ravenna), in France (Paimpol; Chateau-Thierry, Essômes-sur-Marne, Bugueles, Douarnenez, Brest, Orléans, L'île d'Oléron), in Ireland (Cork/Cobh), in the United States (New York, Bay City), in the Netherlands (Appingedam; Oudewater; Rotterdam), in Belgium (Mouscron) and in Germany (Bremen-Vegesack) and many other locations. As a member of ISSA, the group collaborates with international artists associated within the organization. In 2008, songs by Banana Boat were published on albums of a collective charity project Lafitte's Return (USA). Banana Boat's music has been broadcast by numerous radio stations in Europe and beyond. In the beginning of the year 2009 the group has finalized miniproject entitled A Little A Cappella - Polish-Irish Harmony in partnership with the Irish star of the musical stage, Eleanor McEvoy. The song "Little Look," (written and composed by Eleanor McEvoy and arranged by Tomasz Czarny) entered the most prestigious Polish hitlist, Lista Przebojów Programu Trzeciego, immediately after the single had been released.

Awards and prizes
Apart from numerous Grand Prix awards, First Prizes and Audience's Favorite's Prizes awarded by the jury panels and audiences of all of the most important maritime music festivals in Poland, Banana Boat has become a double first runner-up for the CARA Award of the Contemporary A Cappella Society of America in the categories of The Best World/Folk Album 2005 (for the album A morze tak, a może nie...) and The Best World/Folk Song 2005 (for the song "Arktyka" of the mentioned album). In 2016, the group's 2015 minialbum Aquareal was named the first runner up for the 2015 CARA Award in the same category.

Discography
 A morze tak, a może nie (BananaArt.Pl 2004)<ref name="A morze tak, a może nie... RARB review of the album">{{cite web|url=http://www.rarb.org/reviews/497.html|title=A morze tak, a może nie...|author=|publisher=RARB|date=2008-12-22}}</ref>
 Banana Boat...Świątecznie (BananaArt.Pl 2004), (six Christmas carols)
 Songs in collection Szanty dla Pajacyka, the proceeds of which support Polish Humanitarian Organisation (2004).
 Songs in charity collections Lafitte's Return (vols. 3 and 4), of which the total proceeds support the musical education of the post-Katrina New Orleans (2008)
  A Little A Cappella - Polish-Irish Harmony a single featuring Eleanor McEvoy (BananaArt.Pl 2009)
  Aquareal (BananaArt.Pl 2015) - a minialbum

See also
 A cappella
 Sea shanty

References

Literature of the subject
Jerzy S. Łątka, Rozfalowana ziemia. Dzieje ruchu szantowego w Polsce [Wavy Earth: The History of the Sea-Shanty Movement in Poland], Kraków: Towarzystwo Słowaków w Polsce, 2007
Pat Sheridan, "A New Musical Idiom. Poland: World leaders in the preservation and promotion of maritime music?" In: Ferment, 2008
Assorted articles in the Szantymaniak Magazine

External links
the Official Website of the Banana Boat
Archive of the past concerts of Banana Boat
Banana Boat in MySpace
Banana Boat in Acapedia

Polish musical groups
Professional a cappella groups
Maritime music